Stephen Swift (born 21 July 1980) is a Scottish former professional footballer and manager, who is currently assistant manager to Jim Duffy at Clyde.

Career
Swift began his career with Benburb with whom he was capped at Junior level for Scotland. After an unsuccessful trial with Motherwell, he signed for Livingston in 2000 on a delayed transfer, finally arriving at the club in 2001. A pacy right back, Swift was loaned out to Cowdenbeath, initially on a three-month deal, however the move was made permanent and the player departed Livingston without having made a first team appearance.

Swift left Cowdenbeath in 2002 to drop back to Junior level, joining Linlithgow Rose where he was re-united with his former Benburb boss, Jim Sinnet. Stepping back up again at the end of the following season, Swift joined Stranraer where the club won the Third Division championship in his first season, then followed that with promotion to the First Division a year later. He later played for Queen of the South and Ayr United before dropping to the Juniors again, firstly with Irvine Meadow with whom he won the West Region Premier Division, West of Scotland Cup and other honours and was in the Irvine Meadow team that reached the fourth round of the Scottish Cup in 2009–10 before moving to Pollok.

Swift was appointed co-manager of Kilbirnie Ladeside in March 2012 in partnership with ex-Pollok teammate Mark Crilly and assumed sole charge following Crilly's resignation in February 2015. He led Ladeside to victory in the Ayrshire Sectional League Cup in October 2016 but resigned from his position the following month. After a short spell coaching at Largs Thistle, Swift briefly resumed his playing career with Kilwinning Rangers before joining BSC Glasgow as their new manager in April 2017. On 27 April 2021, Swift was appointed manager of League Two club Stenhousemuir. Swift would depart the club in December 2022.

Managerial record

References

External links 

1980 births
Living people
Footballers from Glasgow
Scottish footballers
Benburb F.C. players
Cowdenbeath F.C. players
Livingston F.C. players
Linlithgow Rose F.C. players
Stranraer F.C. players
Ayr United F.C. players
Queen of the South F.C. players
Irvine Meadow XI F.C. players
Pollok F.C. players
Kilwinning Rangers F.C. players
Scottish football managers
Scottish Football League players
Scottish Junior Football Association players
Association football defenders
Stenhousemuir F.C. managers
Kilbirnie Ladeside F.C. managers
Broomhill F.C. (Scotland) managers
Scottish Professional Football League managers
Scottish Junior Football Association managers
Lowland Football League managers